The expression Hong Kong Letters Patent is most commonly used to refer to the Hong Kong Letters Patent 1917, one of the principal constitutional documents of British Hong Kong (others being the Hong Kong Letters Patent 1960, the Hong Kong Letters Patent 1982, the Hong Kong Letters Patent 1991 (No. 1), and the Hong Kong Royal Instructions 1917); however, it may also refer to any other Hong Kong Letters Patent or be used as a generic term covering all Hong Kong Letters Patent.

List of all Hong Kong Letters Patent
Hong Kong Letters Patent of 1843 (no formal short title)
Hong Kong Letters Patent of 1875 (no formal short title)
Hong Kong Letters Patent of 1877 (no formal short title)
Hong Kong Letters Patent of 1888 (no formal short title)
Hong Kong Letters Patent 1917
Hong Kong Letters Patent 1939
Hong Kong Letters Patent 1950
Hong Kong Letters Patent 1955
Hong Kong Letters Patent 1960
Hong Kong Letters Patent 1967
Hong Kong Letters Patent 1971
Hong Kong Letters Patent 1976
Hong Kong Letters Patent 1977
Hong Kong Letters Patent 1982
Hong Kong Letters Patent 1985
Hong Kong Letters Patent 1986
Hong Kong Letters Patent 1988
Hong Kong Letters Patent 1990
Hong Kong Letters Patent 1991 (No. 1)
Hong Kong Letters Patent 1991 (No. 2)
Hong Kong Letters Patent 1993
Hong Kong Letters Patent 1994
Hong Kong Letters Patent 1995
Hong Kong Letters Patent 1996

See also
 Estatuto Orgânico de Macau, Portuguese Macau equivalent
 History of Hong Kong
 Hong Kong Royal Instructions

British Hong Kong
History of Hong Kong
Law of Hong Kong
Constitutions of former British colonies